The New Zealand goose is the common name given to the extinct genus Cnemiornis of the family Anatidae, subfamily Anserinae.
 	
 
The genus, endemic to New Zealand, consisted of two species: the North Island goose, C. gracilis and the South Island goose C. calcitrans. This goose was as large as some small moa. The North Island species had  in body mass while the South Island species reached , far surpassing Canada and Cape barren geese. They were flightless, with much-reduced webbing on the feet, an adaptation for terrestrial dwelling similar to that of the nene of Hawaii. They were never particularly common, and like many other large New Zealand endemic species they were subject to hunting pressures from the settling Polynesians, as well as predation upon their eggs and hatchlings by kiore/Polynesian rat (which accompanied the settlers) and the settlers' dogs, and were extinct before the arrival of European settlers. They are usually considered most closely related to the Cape Barren goose of Australia.

References

External links
North Island Goose. Cnemiornis gracilis. by Paul Martinson. Artwork produced for the book Extinct Birds of New Zealand, by Alan Tennyson, Te Papa Press, Wellington, 2006
South Island Goose. Cnemiornis calcitrans. by Paul Martinson. Artwork produced for the book Extinct Birds of New Zealand, by Alan Tennyson, Te Papa Press, Wellington, 2006
Recreation of the New Zealand goose vocalisation Morning Report 10 May 2019 Radio New Zealand.

Anatidae
Extinct flightless birds
Extinct birds of New Zealand
Higher-level bird taxa restricted to New Zealand
Late Quaternary prehistoric birds
Holocene extinctions
Geese